The Real Lincoln: A New Look at Abraham Lincoln, His Agenda, and an Unnecessary War is a biography of Abraham Lincoln written by Thomas J. DiLorenzo, a professor of economics at Loyola University Maryland, in 2002. He was severely critical of Lincoln's United States presidency.

Summary
DiLorenzo criticizes Lincoln for the suspension of habeas corpus, violations of the First Amendment, war crimes committed by generals in the American Civil War, and the expansion of government power. He argues that Lincoln's views on race exhibited forms of bigotry that are commonly overlooked today, such as belief in white racial superiority, against miscegenation, and even against black men being jurors. He says that Lincoln instigated the American Civil War not over slavery but rather to centralize power and to enforce the strongly protectionist Morrill Tariff; similarly, he criticizes Lincoln for his strong support of Henry Clay's American System economic plan. DiLorenzo regards Lincoln as the political and ideological heir of Alexander Hamilton, and contends that Lincoln achieved by the use of armed force the centralized state which Hamilton failed to create in the early years of the United States.

DiLorenzo's negative view of Lincoln is explicitly derived from his anarcho-capitalist views. He considers Lincoln to have opened the way to later instances of government involvement in the American economy, for example Franklin Roosevelt's New Deal, of which DiLorenzo strongly disapproves. DiLorenzo objects to historians who described Lincoln as having carried out "a capitalist revolution", since in DiLorenzo's view protectionist policies such as Lincoln strongly advocated and implemented "are not true Capitalism." In DiLorenzo's explicitly expressed view, only free trade policies are truly capitalist –a distinction not shared by most economists and political scientists. DiLorenzo declares protectionism and mercantilism to be one the same, using the two as interchangeable and frequently talking of "Lincoln's Mercantilist policies". In general, academics do not regard protectionism and mercantilism as being identical, at most regarding the two as having some common features.

In the foreword to DiLorenzo's book, Walter E. Williams, a professor of economics at George Mason University, says that "Abraham Lincoln's direct statements indicated his support for slavery," and adds that he "defended slave owners' right to own their property" by supporting the Fugitive Slave Act of 1850.

Reception 
Herman Belz reviewed DiLorenzo's book together with Charles Adams's When in the Course of Human Events: Arguing the Case for Southern Secession, and claimed that it quoted Lincoln out of context, saying:

He says they have a "simple-minded understanding of the relationship between politics and economics, between moral ends and productive entrepreneurial activity." He also noted that "these not very scholarly books" were of most interest for "their reflection of recent trends in Civil War historiography. Two developments stand out. The first is radicalization of the interrelated issues of slavery, civil rights, and race relations. The second development is a revival of interest in secession as a solution to the problem of government centralization."

Reviewing for The Independent Review, Richard M. Gamble noted that DiLorenzo's book "manages to raise fresh and morally probing questions" and that it "exposes Lincoln's embarrassing views on race, his ambition for economic nationalism, his rewriting of the history of the founding of the nation, his cavalier violation of constitutional limits on the presidency, and his willingness to wage a barbaric total war to achieve his ends". But, Gamble notes that The Real Lincoln "is seriously compromised by careless errors of fact, misuse of sources, and faulty documentation," which taken all together "constitute a near-fatal threat to DiLorenzo's credibility as a historian."

Gamble listed numerous fallacies of the book as follows: "Thomas Jefferson was not among the framers of the Constitution (pp. 69–70); Lincoln advised sending freed slaves to Liberia in a speech in 1854, not "during the war" (pp. 16–17); Lincoln was not a member of the Illinois state legislature in 1857 (p. 18); the commerce clause was not an "amendment,"; Thaddeus Stevens was a Pennsylvania representative, not a senator (p. 140); and Fort Sumter was not a customs house (p. 242)."
Additionally: "In chapter 3, DiLorenzo claims that in a letter to Salmon P. Chase, Lincoln "admitted that the original [Emancipation] proclamation had no legal justification, except as a war measure" (p. 37). His source, however, is the recollections of a conversation (not a letter) that portrait artist Francis Bicknell Carpenter (not Chase) had with Lincoln, and at no point do these recollections sustain DiLorenzo's summary of them. Moreover, in the reference for this section, DiLorenzo misidentifies the title of his source as Paul Angle's The American Reader, when in fact the jumbled material comes from Angle's The Lincoln Reader." He also notes that DiLorenzo claims, for example, "that in the four years between 1860 and 1864, population in the thirteen largest Northern cities rose by 70 percent" (p. 225)." Gamble checks the source and finds it says that total rate of growth took place over 15 years.

Historian Brian Dirck said that few Civil War scholars take DiLorenzo seriously, pointing to his "narrow political agenda and faulty research".

Ken Masugi of the Claremont Institute wrote in National Review that "DiLorenzo frequently distorts the meaning of the primary sources he cites, Lincoln most of all." Masugi provides the following example:

Masugi further asserts that DiLorenzo failed to recognize "a disunited America might have become prey for the designs of European imperial powers, which would have put an end to the experiment in self-government."

DiLorenzo responded saying that Masugi was selective in his presentation about Lincoln and "relies entirely on a few of Lincoln's prettier speeches, ignoring his less attractive ones as well as his actual behavior." He concluded that Lincoln used his considerable rhetorical skills to camouflage his true intentions and mask his behavior.

Ken Whitefield noted that:

Writing in 2013 about DiLorenzo's book and the work of other "Lincoln haters", Rich Lowry said:

See also
Forced into Glory

Notes

Further reading

External links
 BookTV: The Real Lincoln lecture by Thomas DiLorenzo, May 2002
 The Real Abraham Lincoln: A Debate debate transcript with Harry V. Jaffa & Thomas J. DiLorenzo, May 2002
 Abraham Lincoln interview with Thomas J. DiLorenzo by C-SPAN, 2008 (YouTube)

2002 non-fiction books
American biographies
American history books
American political books
Biographies of Abraham Lincoln
History books about the American Civil War